Pinuneg is a Filipino blood sausage originating from the Igorots.  It is made with pig's blood (sometimes cow's or carabao's blood), minced pork fat, salt, red onions, ginger, and garlic stuffed into a casing made from pig's small intestine. It is traditionally prepared during pig sacrifice ceremonies.

References

Philippine sausages